JioTV is an Indian  streaming television service, owned by Jio Platforms, a subsidiary of Reliance Industries Limited. JioTV is a live TV channel streaming platform. JioTV has over 950+ channels.

History
JioTV, launched in 2016, from the digital arm of LYF (Jio), LYF Digital Convergence Limited. JioTV, an streaming television service offering LIVE TV and Catch Up Content to end consumers on their mobile phones, tablets, laptops, desktops, entertainment boxes and connected TVs.

JioTV web version was launched on Dec 2017   but it was taken down after two days because of some technical litigation issues.

Content Partners 

JioTV has partnered with different broadcasting companies such as Viacom18, Sony, Zee, NDTV, Times Now, TV Today Network, Turner, ABP News Network, and Discovery network to provide content in different categories such as Business, Devotional, Education, Entertainment, Infotainment, Kids, News and Sports. JioTV has 17 'Jio Darshan' channels which telecast proceedings from a few Indian temples

32 government education channels on JioTV are hosted by the Ministry of Human Resources Development under Swayam Prabha.

In June 2020, JioTV tied up with the Assam government to host educational channel "Gyan Brikshya".. In July 2020, JioTV has partnered with Manipur, Maharashtra, Haryana and Telangana state governments to telecast education channels for e-classes.

Strategic Partnership 
Nov 2020 - Partnered with Rewind Network to distribute HITS content through JioTV platform

Viewership
Reliance's JioTV was one of the most popular streaming apps across India, recorded a staggering 84 million unique visitors in March 2020, an increase from 74 million unique visitors in March of the previous year. The company is owned by Jio Platforms, the digital service business of the multinational Reliance Industires Limited conglomerate.

According to a Kalagato report on OTT space, in 2018, JioTV saw around 18% of active users after Hotstar which has 40% active users. In terms of national reach, Hotstar and JioTV both had 30% and 24% respectively market share. 

JioTV recorded 74.5 million unique visitors in March 2019, which was an increase from 31.2 million unique visitors in March of the previous year.

Channel list

Assamese

Bengali 

 Bangla Bhakti
 Vande Tripura
 Zee Bangla
 Zee Bangla HD
 Colors Bangla
 Colors Bangla HD
 Aakash Aath
 Sony Aath
 Channel Vision
 DD Bangla
 Friends Tv
 Discovery Channel Bangla 
 Sristi Tv
 Purnima Tv
 Nickelodeon Nick Bangla
 Nick Bangla 
 Rongeen Tv
 Zee Bangla Cinema
 Amar Cinema
 Khushboo Bangla
 Colors Bangla Cinema 
 Sangeet Bangla 
 Sky 12
 Zee 24 Ghanta
 ABP Ananda 
 News Time
 News18 Bangla 
 Rplus News
 Headlines Tripura
 Kolkata Live
 TV Bangla
 Bhoomi 24x7
 Tara Tv
 24Hrs Tv
 Tv9 Bangla 
 Doinandin
 Express News
 Ananda Barta
 Tribe Tv
 Amaar Tv
 Raatdin News Network
 News Bartaman 24X7
 Globe TV

Bhojpuri

English

French

Gujarati

Hindi

Kannada

Malayalam

Marathi

Nepali

Odia

Punjabi

Tamil

Telugu

Urdu

See also
Jio - mobile operator
JioCinema – video streaming service
JioSaavn – music streaming service

References

Internet television streaming services